William Bayley (1879–1955) was a politician in Manitoba, Canada.

William Bayley may also refer to:
 William Butterworth Bayley (1782–1860), Acting Governor-General of India
Will Bayley (William John Bayley, born 1988), English para table tennis player

See also
 William Bayly (disambiguation)
 William Bailey (disambiguation)